AKF may refer to:

 Aga Khan Foundation - a private, not-for-profit international development agency.
 Al-Khair Foundation - an international Muslim aid non-governmental organization based in the United Kingdom.
 American Kidney Fund - a medical non-profit organization based in the United States.
 Animal Kingdom Foundation - an animal welfare group based in the Philippines.
 Asian Karatedo Federation, a sports federation that, among other things, organizes the Asian Karate Championships.
 Australian Koala Foundation - an australian non-profit scientific organization.